is a Japanese dark fantasy and post-apocalyptic anime TV series adapted from the manga of the same name by Hajime Isayama. It is set in a world where humanity lives inside cities surrounded by enormous walls due to the Titans, gigantic humanoid beings who devour humans seemingly without reason. The story follows the adventures of Eren Yeager, and his friends Mikasa Ackerman and Armin Arlert, whose lives are changed forever after the Colossal Titan breaches the wall of their home town. Vowing revenge and to reclaim the world from the Titans, Eren and his friends join the Scout Regiment, an elite group of soldiers who fight Titans.

The fourth and final season first premiered on December 7, 2020; the second part of the season premiered on January 10, 2022, and the third and final part will air in two halves; the first half, a one-hour special, premiered on March 4, 2023.

Series overview

Episodes

Season 1 (2013)

Season 2 (2017)

Season 3 (2018–19)

Season 4 (2020–23)

OVA

The following bonus original video animation episodes are released along with selected volumes of the manga. The first one, "Ilse's Notebook," adapting a special chapter from tankōbon volume 5, was originally scheduled to be released on August 9, 2013, bundled with the volume 11 limited edition, but was postponed and included with a limited edition of volume 12, released on December 9, 2013, instead. The OVA was bundled on subtitled DVD with the English limited edition release of the 17th manga volume, released on December 1, 2015. A second OVA was released on April 9, 2014, bundled with the 13th volume of the series, this one focused on the members of the 104th Training Corps. This OVA was bundled on subtitled DVD with the English limited edition release of the 20th manga volume, released on December 27, 2016. The third OVA, "Distress," about a 104th Training Corps wilderness exercise, was released on August 8, 2014, bundled with the 14th volume of the series. On May 2, 2022, it was announced that Attack on Titan's eight OVAs would be dubbed and released by Funimation and Crunchyroll weekly starting on May 8, 2022.

Notes

References

External links
  

Attack on Titan